Dean Thomas (born 4 January 1973) is a motorcycle racer from Australia.  He won his home country's Supersport championship in 1995 after two other top 5 championship finishes, and was 4th in the Australian Superbike Championship series a year later; however, for 1997 he headed for the United Kingdom to race.  He came 4th in the country's Supersport series that year, the first of 4 successive top-6 championship finishes highlighted by a run of 11 front-row starts out of 12 in 2000, and a victory as a European Supersport wild card. For 2001 he raced in Supersport World Championship, and struggled on largely unfamiliar circuits. He was 16th overall, and tellingly took his best result of 6th at Phillip Island.

British Superbike Championship 2002-2006
He first raced in the British Superbike series in 2002 for the Dienza Performance team, finishing 11th overall in a season hampered by several oil leaks. In 2003 he stepped back down to Supersport, but returned to BSB for 2004 on a Ducati. He came 7th overall, again qualifying better than he raced on occasion. A pair of 4th place finishes at Oulton Park were a highlight.  Fittingly, in the final round he qualified 7th and finished both races in 7th.

He moved to the Hawk Kawasaki team for 2005, noting that the bike is  "very different to the Ducati where you have to be very fierce with the throttle... on the Kawasaki you have to be much smoother, which I'm learning quickly."  He was 6th overall, finishing every race with a best result of 4th. The first half of 2006 was less encouraging, until a huge crash at Snetterton left him with fractured ribs and a punctured lung, missing several races. For 2007 he raced a Samsung-backed Suzuki.

Beyond Racing
In 2008 he did not race, instead managing the career of Yamaha R1 Cup rider Sam Warren.

Career statistics

British Superbike Championship

References
 Official site

Australian motorcycle racers
Living people
British Superbike Championship riders
Supersport World Championship riders
1973 births
People from the Mid North Coast
Racing drivers from New South Wales